Kochurino is a rural locality (a village) in Ust-Alexeyevskoye Rural Settlement, Velikoustyugsky District, Vologda Oblast, Russia. The population was 5 as of 2002.

Geography 
Kochurino is located 64 km southeast of Veliky Ustyug (the district's administrative centre) by road. Voronino is the nearest rural locality.

References 

Rural localities in Velikoustyugsky District